Edwin Whitefield (September 22, 1816 – December 26, 1892) was a landscape artist who is best known for his lithographed views of North American cities and for a number of illustrated books on colonial homes in New England.

Born in East Lulworth, near Wareham, Dorset, England, he emigrated to the United States in 1838.

Whitefield visited a series of North American cities, where he published books reproducing the paintings he made there.  His collections were published by subscription.  The cities he visited included Brooklyn (1845), Toronto (1851), Quebec City (1852), Montreal (1853-1854), Hamilton, Ontario (1854), Ithaca, New York (1855), Jamestown (1882), and Boston (1889).

In 1856, after visiting Minnesota, he made it his home, using landscapes to help persuade those seeking land to let him play a role in their purchases.

Whitefield Township in Kandiyohi County, Minnesota is named for the artist while nearby Lake Lillian was named for Whitefield's wife.

He died in Dedham, Massachusetts.

References

External links 

 The Winterthur Library Overview of an archival collection about Edwin Whitefield.

1816 births
1892 deaths
19th-century American painters
American male painters
American printmakers
American landscape painters
Artists from Dorset
19th-century American male artists